Matilda's Legacy is a 1915 American silent comedy film featuring Oliver Hardy.

Cast
 Mae Hotely as Matilda Honeysuckle
 Ed Lawrence as Seth Perkins
 Jerold T. Hevener as Si Dewberry
 Oliver Hardy as Fatty Waite

See also
 List of American films of 1915
 Oliver Hardy filmography

External links

1915 films
1915 short films
American silent short films
Silent American comedy films
American black-and-white films
1915 comedy films
Films directed by Arthur Hotaling
American comedy short films
1910s American films